Iginio (or Igino) Ugo Tarchetti (29 June 1839 – 25 March 1869) was an Italian author, poet, and journalist.

Life 
Born in San Salvatore Monferrato, his military career was cut short by ill health, and in 1865 he settled in Milan. Here he entered literary study, becoming part of the Scapigliatura, a literary movement animated by a spirit of rebellion against traditional culture. He worked on several newspapers and published a torrent of short stories, novels, and poems. He contracted tuberculosis and died in poverty at the age of 29.

Tarchetti published his plagiarized translation of "The Mortal Immortal" (1833) by Mary Shelley as "The Elixir of Immortality", with small but significant changes but without attribution. He also appropriated foreign texts in the Gothic tradition, such as works by E. T. A. Hoffmann, Edgar Allan Poe and Theophile Gautier. Lawrence Venuti, who discovered the antecedents of "Mortal Immortal" while translating Tarchetti's Fantastic Tales, considers his appropriation as serving the social agenda of Scapigliatura.  Fantastic Tales was the first ever translation of Tarchetti into English.

Works 
Opere, Cappelli, Bologna, 1967.
Paolina, Mursia, Milano, 1994.
L'Amore Nell'Arte, Passigli, Firenze, 1992.
Racconti Fantastici + Racconti Vari, Bompiani, Milano, 1993. Translated by Lawrence Venuti as Fantastic Tales, Mercury House, San Francisco, 1992, winner of Bram Stoker Award for Best Fiction Collection.
Una Nobile Follia, Mondadori, Milano, 2004.
Fosca, Mondadori, Milano, 1981. Translated by Lawrence Venuti as  Passion: A Novel (Mercury House, 1994).

Adaptations 
Fosca, written in 1869, was the basis for Ettore Scola's 1981 film, Passione d'amore, which in turn served as the basis for James Lapine and Stephen Sondheim's 1994 musical Passion.

References 

 Pireddu, Nicoletta. “Poe spoetizzato: l’esotismo tarchettiano,” in _Fantastico Poe_, ed. by R. Cagliero (Ombre Corte, 2004): 157-176.

External links
 
 
 

People from the Province of Alessandria
1839 births
1869 deaths
Italian male poets
Italian journalists
Italian male journalists
Scapigliatura Movement
19th-century Italian journalists
19th-century Italian poets
19th-century Italian male writers